Martin Ditcham is an English drummer, percussionist and songwriter.

Ditcham is a prolific session musician, working with artists such as Henry Cow, Status Quo, Elton John, The Rolling Stones, Roger Daltrey, Sade, Mary Black, Nik Kershaw, Chris Rea, Tina Turner, Tom Robinson, Talk Talk, Everything but the Girl, Latin Quarter, Mark Knopfler, and The Waterboys. He resides in London, which is also his hometown.

References

English drummers
British male drummers
English session musicians
English songwriters
Henry Cow members
Year of birth missing (living people)
Living people
Musicians from London